Neighbours is an Australian television soap opera. It was first broadcast on 18 March 1985 and airs on digital channel 10 Peach. The following is a list of characters that first appear in the show in 2021, by order of first appearance. All characters are introduced by the show's executive producer Jason Herbison. Curtis Perkins was introduced towards the end of January, and Jesse Porter made his debut in March. Sheila Canning began appearing in April. Evelyn Farlow arrived in August, followed by Britney Barnes in September and Felicity Higgins during October, whilst December also saw the arrival of Wendy Rodwell.

Curtis Perkins

Curtis Perkins, played by Nathan Borg, made his first appearance on 28 January 2021. The character and Borg's casting details were announced on 3 December 2020, which is the United Nations' International Day of Persons with Disabilities. Borg is the first actor with a cochlear implant to appear on Australian television. Of his casting, he stated "Growing up I never saw anyone like me on television, so I knew it was time to have a hard of hearing actor on our Australian screens. I think it's important in this industry that people with all disabilities of all ages get to tell their stories." Borg began filming his first scenes for the recurring role of Curtis in November. Curtis is a newly qualified teacher who joins the teaching staff at Erinsborough High, "under the watchful eye" of Susan Kennedy (Jackie Woodburne) and Jane Harris (Annie Jones). He is billed as "an easy-going guy" and "far tougher than he lets on". Series producer Jason Herbison said Curtis is independent and not defined by his disability. He also has a link to one of the established characters. Borg was initially contracted for eight weeks, but the producers asked him to continue in the role and he "was happy to bring more of Curtis, for sure." Curtis was later given a love interest in the form of Jesse Porter (Cameron Robbie), who comes to spy on a few residents and enters into a fake relationship with Harlow Robinson (Jenna Donovan). Borg told Joe Julians of Radio Times that Curtis is hurt by Jesse's behaviour and "feels quite betrayed and very angry". Borg also told Julians that the plot allows the audience to see a new side to Curtis, as he gets angry and even physical at one point. Borg admitted that he really enjoyed playing out those scenes and exploring another side to the character.

Principal of Erinsborough High, Susan Kennedy introduces Curtis to fellow teacher Jane Harris and explains that this is his first teaching appointment. She also tells Jane that Curtis is deaf and will be teaching some Auslan classes for the Year 9 Connections program. Jane asks Curtis how he copes if he cannot hear what the students are saying, and he shows her his cochlear implant and mentions that he can lip read. Susan asks Curtis and Jane to keep an eye on student Hendrix Greyson (Benny Turland). Jane and Susan later notice Hendrix sitting alone at lunch and Curtis tells them that he was quiet and withdrawn in class, before offering to have a talk with him. Curtis tells Hendrix that it took guts to come back to school and tries to persuade him to go to the common room, but Hendrix says he does not have any friends and points out that the girls in their class were laughing at him. Curtis tells him that he is over-thinking things and the girls could have been laughing about anything. Curtis then tells Hendrix that if he ever needs to talk, he should come find him. At the end of the day, Curtis sees Hendrix punch his locker, which has been graffitied, and Hendrix yells that he hates school before kicking over a bin. After Brent Colefax's (Texas Watterston) personal records are uploaded to the online student resource centre, Jane and Susan ask Curtis whether he is responsible, but he tells them that he was only uploading study resources. They later apologise for jumping the gun, and Curtis admits that he is worried about Brent and asks to put in some extra hours with him. Curtis offers to oversee Year 13 while Jane attends a conference, as he is keen to gain experience and show Susan that he can take on more responsibility. Jane is not sure because of Hendrix and Brent's behaviour, but she allows Curtis to take the class on a trial run.

Upon Jane's return, she learns Curtis has started a vocational project with Hendrix and Brent. She feels that he has taken over the program, which Curtis apologises for. Although Curtis thinks the project is good for the boys, Jane tells him that it is not possible to include more activities as Year 13 has been planned already. Curtis informs Hendrix and Brent that the project has been cancelled, but Hendrix says he will talk with Susan and that he and Brent will move the power tools to The Hive in preparation. Susan allows the project to go ahead, which upsets Jane as she thinks Curtis has gone over her head. She later finds Curtis and Susan discussing the project at Susan's home, and expresses her unhappiness at the way things were handled. Jane wants the project scrapped and tries to make Susan choose between them, but Susan refuses. The following day, Jane and Curtis try to work things out. Curtis tells Jane that he is not trying to undermine her, but he has more to contribute than she realises. Jane offers to think more about his project. After learning Curtis is Vera Punt's (Sally-Anne Upton) nephew, Jane visits Vera in the hospital in order to speak with Curtis. He reveals that he turns his cochlear implant down, as he cannot put up with his aunt's whinging. Jane tells him that she has decided to let the project go ahead as long as Curtis checks in with her weekly. Jane later suggests that Curtis move the power tools from The Hive. When he eventually makes it there, he finds the tools in a van and confronts Holden Brice (Toby Derrick) as he is about to leave. Holden strikes Curtis in the head with a torch, damaging his cochlear implant and preventing Curtis from hearing Nicolette Stone's (Charlotte Chimes) cries for help. Curtis manages to give Levi Canning (Richie Morris) a statement, and is checked over by paramedics, before he is given a temporary implant. He then goes to Susan's house to tell her what happened and expresses his guilt over Nicolette. Levi later shows Curtis a sketch of Holden and Curtis acknowledges that it is the same person who attacked him.

Jane visits a school in Mildura, leaving Curtis in charge of Year 13. When Jane returns, she tells Susan and Curtis of her plans to tweak the school's programme. She takes over from Curtis and tries to help with Hendrix's project, but he does not appreciate her interference and Curtis steps in to distract Jane. He later gets Hendrix to open up to him about his problems, which impresses Jane, until she learns that Curtis knows the principal of the Mildura school and she realises was not sought out for her expertise. Curtis admits that he just wanted some space to prove himself. Days later, Toadfish Rebecchi (Ryan Moloney) thanks Curtis for a character reference he has written for Brent. Curtis asks Toadie if he has researched any other options for Brent and explains a way to keep Brent out of the prison system. They visit Brent together at the remand centre, where Brent apologises to Curtis for everything that happened to him. Curtis then tells Brent that in order to avoid a custodial sentence he could join the Australian Defence Force, which Brent agrees to. A couple of weeks later, Curtis meets up with Jesse Porter and after flirting with each other, they leave Harold's Café in order to spend the night together. Jesse later ignores Curtis's text messages and eventually tells him that he is busy that week, but he will try to meet up with him again soon. The following week, Curtis and Jesse meet in Harold's and Jesse asks if he has ruined his chance. Curtis asks him out for a drink and Jesse suggests meeting up later. Jesse later breaks up with Curtis, claiming that he is too busy. Curtis opens up to Hendrix about the break up and wonders if it is because he is deaf. Hendrix tells him that Jesse was dating someone else and Curtis confronts Jesse outside the hotel. Jesse tries to explain, but when he touches Curtis on the shoulder, Curtis tells Jesse to get off him and shoves him onto the luggage trolley, before leaving. Months later, Curtis voices his concerns to Jane and Susan about Zara Selwyn's (Freya Van Dyke) bad influence on other students. He also puts out a bin fire when Jane freezes at the sight. He tells her and Susan that according to the fire captain there were cigarette butts in the bin, which Jane believes Zara could have smoked. Susan refuses to jump to conclusions, while Curtis says they need to find out who was in the area at the time. He later assists with Aubrey Laing's (Etoile Little) transition to homeschooling, and accompanies her grandmother Shannon Laing (Francesca Waters) to a hearing test. Curtis goes to a Ramsay Street party with Vera a few months later.

Jesse Porter

Jesse Porter, played by Cameron Robbie, made his first appearance on 19 March 2021. The character and Robbie's casting was announced on 16 January 2021. Robbie's older sister Margot Robbie previously appeared in the show from 2008 to 2011 as Donna Freedman. Cameron secured the role of Jesse after an audition and began filming his guest appearance in late 2020. Jesse is a lifeguard who secures a summer job at Lassiter's Hotel, as he tries to work out what he really wants to do with his life. Maddison Hockey and Jess Pullar of TV Week reported that Jesse "comes from a wealthy background, but has decided to break away from the pressures he's had placed on him growing up." Robbie described him as "a pretty fun-loving type of guy" and said there would be "some twists and turns within his story line!" Four months after his introduction, it emerged that Jesse is connected to the Quill family, who run a rival hotel chain, and has been helping them to plot against Lassiters. Robbie thought his "slow-burn" introduction was "a pretty fun character development" and believed that the pay-off when his identity was exposed was also a fun moment for viewers. He explained to Daniel Kilkelly of Digital Spy that spying for the Quills was not Jesse's plan, and he hoped the audience would enjoy finding out the reason why Jesse felt that he could not say no. Robbie continued "Jesse is feeling a lot of pressure on himself. He puts the weight of the world on his shoulders while he's doing his best to please others. But at the same time, he's a little lost. A lot of it is serving an end goal, but also taking opportunities as they come along." He also said Jesse was trying to avoid his own "demons", but felt that he was a good person who has been lying to himself for a long time.

Jesse is hired to work as a bartender and ceremonial lifeguard at The Flamingo Bar, which is located on the fringes of Lassister's Lake. He helps out Roxy Willis (Zima Anderson) and Sheila Canning (Colette Mann), and poses for photos with them to help promote the bar. He later asks them how is he doing, as the job description was vague. After several mistakes, he admits that he has always had trouble remembering people's names. Jesse backs Roxy up when she tells Terese Willis (Rebekah Elmaloglou) that she is the perfect candidate for the bar manager role. Jesse points out Roxy's skills in remembering orders. Terese tells Roxy that she needs to put in an actual application, causing Jesse to apologise for being a bad wingman. He tells Roxy that she would make a great boss, as she is the type of person that makes everything fun. Later, Jesse, Roxy and Kyle Canning (Chris Milligan) approach Paul Robinson (Stefan Dennis) and Terese to ask for permission to set up a volleyball court at The Flamingo Bar and Terese accepts. Jesse also presents the bar's new merchandise. During The Flamingo Bar's first volleyball tournament, Jesse is seen scoring and umpiring the matches. Jesse takes part in the Longest Workout competition and ends up helping Melanie Pearson (Lucinda Cowden) hide from her boyfriend Toadfish Rebecchi (Ryan Moloney). Paul later approaches Jesse to ask about his interests, career path and relationship status, which Jesse initially confuses for flirting. Jesse wins the competition and is congratulated by Harlow Robinson (Jemma Donovan). After Harlow is offered the job of Terese's EA, Paul arranges for her to talk to Jesse about feeding concerns up to management, something an EA would deal with. Harlow tells Jesse that Paul has an ulterior motive in getting them to talk, knowing that he disapproves of her current relationship. Jesse convinces Harlow to take the EA job as she can push more green initiatives. Jesse later meets up with Curtis Perkins (Nathan Borg) for lunch, but they spend the time flirting and decide to go elsewhere.

Jesse organises a picnic for Harlow to celebrate her taking the EA job and they discuss their plan to fake a relationship between them, so Paul will stay out of her personal life. Harlow thanks Jesse for going along with the plan and he tells her that he likes hanging out with her. Jesse meets with Shay Quill (Yasmin Kassim) from Lassiters' rivals, the Quill Group. Jesse gives Shay a report about a drive-in movie night idea that Harlow has had. When Shay demands more information, Jesse tells her that Paul and Terese already know the Quill Group stole their film festival idea and that they will eventually figure out that he is spying on them. Shay tells Jesse not to tell her it cannot be done and questions if he would say that to Julie Quill (Gail Easdale), Jesse says no and that he will work it out. Jesse asks Paul to be his mentor and Paul agrees to consider the idea. Jesse also arranges to meet up for a date with Curtis to make up for ghosting him. He later learns that Harlow and Roxy know about him and Curtis, but they assure him they will not say anything. Roxy catches Jesse in Terese's office, and later that day, he meets up with Shay and admits that it has not been easy to find out the information she wants. Shay tells him to copy everything, as she wants to know every detail about what Lassiters is planning. Jesse says he is doing his best, but Shay replies that it is not enough and he is about as good for the business as his mother, Julie. The Quill Group pull out of hosting the film festival after Harlow tells Jesse that the organisers are facing a big lawsuit and he relays the information to Shay. Lassiters then wins the film festival contract and Harlow tells Jesse that Lassiters is also planning on buying some land next to a Quill Hotel in a bid undermine their business. Jesse breaks up with Curtis, claiming that he is too busy, but Curtis later confronts him about dating someone else and pushes him into the luggage trolley.

Terese learns Jesse's true identity and confronts him. He admits that he hated spying, but Terese fires him and tells him not to come near her family again. When Jesse comes to collect his belongings from the hotel, he tells Harlow that he let his family buy the land, as a way of apologising to her and Terese. He admits that he does not want anything to do with the Quills, and later apologises to Paul and Terese, before mentioning that he was happy being around them. Terese later invites Jesse to stay at the hotel after learning he has been thrown out of his apartment by his step-siblings, who blame him for the collapse of the Quill hotel. Terese decides to invest in the hotel, but is later forced to pull out of the deal. She gives Jesse a job at Lassiters instead and becomes his mentor. The Lassiters staff go on strike when Harlow is promoted to a job they feel she did not earn, but Jesse does not join them. He later advises Harlow in her decision to accept a demotion and helps liaise with the striking staff. When thanking him for his actions, Terese inadvertently calls Jesse by the name of her son Josh (Harley Bonner), whose death Julie was responsible for. After putting the initial awkwardness of her mistake behind them, the two continue to grow closer. After learning more about Josh, Jesse contacts his mother and she asks him to visit her. Terese offers to accompany Jesse to visit Julie in prison. Jesse learns from Terese that the Quill Group has debts from a bad deal, which is why the sale fell through, and he says he will discuss it with Julie. Paul accuses Jesse of having an agenda when it comes to the investment and warns him to keep Terese out of it. On the day of the visit, Paul's son David Tanaka (Takaya Honda) tells Jesse that the family are concerned about his relationship with Terese. He encourages him to distance himself from her and move on if he really cares about Terese. Jesse fails to show up at the prison, resigns from Lassiter's and leaves for Sydney. Jesse returns the following month after being contacted by Paul, and shares a final conversation with Terese.

Sheila Canning

Sheila Canning, played by Shareena Clanton, made her first appearance on 7 April 2021. Clanton's casting was announced on 29 March 2021. She filmed her guest stint from October 2020 to March 2021. Clanton's character shares the same name as show regular Sheila Canning, played by Colette Mann, leading to a misunderstanding between the two women. Clanton previously played the role of Doreen Anderson in Wentworth, a character Mann originated on Prisoner. David Knox of TV Tonight called it "cheeky casting". While she is visiting Erinsborough, Clanton's Sheila does some online shopping, but her items are mistakenly sent to Mann's Sheila, who gives some of them away to friends. The women later meet and Mann's Sheila realises she has stolen Clanton's Sheila's mail. Shortly before her first appearance aired, Clanton made allegations of racism and misogyny on the Neighbours set and declared she would never work for the show again. A critic for the Evening Express had a positive reaction to the character's stint, writing "Her stay in Erinsborough may have been short, but it's certainly been memorable".

After arriving in Erinsborough, Sheila compliments Susan Kennedy (Jackie Woodburne) on her earrings. Sheila visits The Hive, an arts hot desking space, and helps Ned Willis (Ben Hall) wipe blue paint from his face. She observes that photos on The Hive's website did not capture how large the place was. Paul Robinson (Stefan Dennis) reveals that Sheila is a potential buyer of the business. After smelling Chloe Brennan's (April Rose Pengilly) hand cream and figuring out that it was the same one she recently purchased, Sheila realises that someone else has been receiving her mail. She then notices the shoes she had ordered being worn by Sheila Canning and confronts her, before revealing that they share the same name and that the items were for her. Erinsborough Sheila apologises for taking the items and, with the help of Roxy Willis (Zima Anderson), gathers all them up and tries to give them back, but Sheila does not want them and asks to be left alone. During a meeting about The Hive, Paul tells Sheila how successful the business is at the moment and that he is only selling as he is getting out of real estate. Sheila also realises that Ned is a successful artist and tells him he is wasted working for Paul. A USB containing the real financial details and bookings at The Hive is slipped under Sheila's hotel room door, which leads her to cancel the deal with Paul. She later thanks Ned for his help, although he denies it was him. After seeing how passionate Ned is about art, Sheila tells Paul that she wants to buy The Hive after all, but at a lower price. Ned helps Sheila out with some painting lessons and she asks him about plans for his next project. She also learns about his girlfriend Yashvi Rebecchi (Olivia Junkeer) and how she is not into art as much as they are. Sheila later asks her assistant to gather information on Ned. She also attends a lunch at Sheila's home, along with Bea Nilsson (Bonnie Anderson) and Levi Canning (Richie Morris), where she offers to teach them her Aboriginal language after speaking with an elder.

Sheila brings her hire car to the garage to be looked at by Bea, who finds a folder containing information on Ned inside. Sheila later overhears Roxy and Kyle Canning (Chris Milligan) talking about her and they tell her about the file Bea found. Ned confronts her and Sheila explains that she asked her assistant to look into him as she is considering turning The Hive into an open art space and wants him to run it. Bea apologises for taking the file, while Ned tells Sheila that he trusts her and opens up about his past. Sheila leaves a negative review for the garage online, and although she later takes it down, Bea is fired from her job. When Ned finds Sheila getting emotional over the painting they are working on, he invites the other Sheila to talk to her. Sheila 2 opens up about the death of her grandmother, and how she could not get home to see her in time due to border closures. Terese Willis (Rebekah Elmaloglou) uncovers Ned's part in The Hive's leaked financial details and Sheila opts to buy the business at the asking price, so Paul does not find out. Ned presents Sheila with a new name and logo for the gallery, and they share an intimate moment when they hold hands. They both act awkwardly around one another when they are later paired together for a local volleyball competition. Ned later admits that he has feelings for Sheila, but then quits the gallery. This prompts Sheila to realise that it is time to visit her family in Perth to make peace with her grandmother's death. Shortly beforehand, Bea opens up to Sheila about her relationship with Levi. Sheila suggests that they have a rehab relationship and she encourages Bea to be honest with Levi, leading to their break up. Sheila offers to buy the car Levi bought Bea, so they can go on a road trip together. Sheila later urges Ned to tell Yashvi what happened between them, before informing him that she has decided to drop the gallery idea for the Hive. Sheila accuses Sheila 2 of being responsible for Bea and Levi's break up. She also mentions that the sound recording equipment was left on at The Hive and recorded her conversation with Ned, which Yashvi also heard. Before she leaves Erinsborough, Sheila visits Ned to say goodbye and asks Kyle to tell his grandmother that she is grateful for their friendship. Sheila eventually comes outside and apologises to Sheila 2 for blaming her for Bea and Levi's break up. Sheila and Bea then drive out of Ramsay Street.

Evelyn Farlow

Evelyn Farlow, played by Paula Arundell, made her first appearance on 24 August 2021. The character and Arundell's casting details were announced on 12 August 2021. Daniel Kilkelly of Digital Spy reported that she will be on-screen for approximately two weeks. Evelyn is the mother of established regular Levi Canning (Richie Morris). Evelyn's beliefs force Levi to keep his polyamorous relationship with Amy Greenwood (Jacinta Stapleton), who is concurrently dating Ned Willis (Ben Hall), a secret during most of her stay.

Evelyn comes to Ramsay Street to surprise her son Levi Canning, who is delighted to see her. Evelyn hands him a belated birthday gift and explains that she is staying in Erinsborough for a couple of days in between work contracts. Levi's grandmother Sheila Canning (Colette Mann) reassures Evelyn that Levi had a birthday celebration. Levi asks his mother how her family is back in Portland and Evelyn says they are well and that the kids helped her pick out his gift. Evelyn is then greeted by Levi's cousin, Kyle Canning (Chris Milligan), and his girlfriend, Roxy Willis (Zima Anderson). Kyle later explains that Evelyn's conservative parents did not allow her to bring Levi up, as he was the product of an affair with a married man. As Evelyn and Levi catch up, they discuss his work and a podcast they listened to. Evelyn tells him about a new keto bread she has found for him and Sheila adds that she has been making all his meals keto-friendly. She then suggests that Evelyn and Levi have dinner at The Waterhole, where she works. Evelyn and Sheila briefly talk about Levi's childhood attack, before Levi joins them. After their meal, Evelyn admits that it was decent considering that it was pub food. Sheila is insulted by this and remarks that Evelyn has been cold to her ever since she arrived. Sheila asks what is going on and Evelyn says nothing is wrong. Later that night, Sheila apologises for overreacting and says that she is protective of her patch. Evelyn then admits that she has always felt excluded from Canning events. Sheila tells her that she always had an invite, but she just stopped coming. Evelyn says that Levi's stepmother, Jackie, turned the Cannings against her and that Sheila did not do anything about it. Evelyn explains that she always felt shame being around Levi. Evelyn then reveals that she tried to visit Levi in Erinsborough three times previously, before backing down, so she asks Sheila to stay out of her way.

Sheila, determined to make amends, apologises for how Evelyn feels. Sheila says that it was hard with Jackie and that she never realised she was shutting Evelyn out. Evelyn says that it was hard to be judged when Frank Jr was not being judged. Evelyn and Levi then go to The Waterhole, where they see Amy Greenwood kissing Ned Willis. Evelyn asks if Levi knows them and he says that they live on Ramsay Street. Amy and Ned approach Evelyn and Levi introduces them to her, telling her they are girlfriend and boyfriend. Once they walk off, Evelyn says that their relationship will not work due to their age difference. Kyle and Evelyn talk about The 82 and Evelyn apologises for the death of Kyle's father, Gary Canning (Damien Richardson). After visiting The 82, Sheila asks Evelyn how long she is staying for and Evelyn assumes Sheila wants her to leave, but Sheila corrects her. Evelyn later tells Levi that she is thinking of staying longer so the two of them can spend more time together. A few days later, Evelyn and Levi go to The Waterhole and order hot chocolates, where they see Amy and Ned sitting together. Evelyn tells Sheila that their age difference is too big and Sheila says that Levi would never get involved in a situation like that. After bickering, Sheila tells Evelyn that she may not find Levi as pure as she thinks he is.

Evelyn then finds Levi in Harold's Café and confronts him, now aware of his relationship with Amy. Levi tries to explain the situation, but Evelyn rushes off. Levi discovers that Karl Kennedy (Alan Fletcher) told Evelyn about his relationship with Amy. Evelyn tells Levi that her opinions do not matter to him. Amy later talks to Evelyn and says that the both of them care for Levi, so they should both try to make it easier for him. Amy says that just because she is also dating Ned, her feelings for Levi will not change. Evelyn disagrees by saying that a romantic relationship cannot be shared. Amy adds that Sheila feels the same. Evelyn says Levi deserves much better, but Amy tells her that Levi is happy. Amy apologises for keeping the relationship a secret. Evelyn sees Levi and invites him to take a seat with her and Amy and the three of them get to know each other. Evelyn has a go at Sheila for keeping it from her and then asks if the only reason she asked her to stay was to break Levi and Amy up. Sheila says that she only had good intentions. Levi and Amy invite Evelyn over for dinner and Evelyn announces that she is leaving tomorrow. Evelyn tells Levi she is still uncomfortable with his relationship, but trusts him enough to make his own decisions. After dinner, Evelyn packs her bags and she departs the following day.

Britney Barnes

Britney Barnes, played by Montana Cox, made her first appearance on 9 September 2021. Cox's casting was announced on the show's Instagram account on 13 June, before Susannah Alexander of Digital Spy confirmed her character name the following day. Cox began filming on the set during the same week and the role marks her acting debut. She stated: "I'm so excited for my guest role in Neighbours. For my first ever acting role to be on Ramsay Street is such a privilege and I can't wait for everyone to meet my character." Cox later stated that she was nervous about going onto set due to her lack of acting experience and she did not know what to expect, but the cast and crew helped make "the transition very easy." Britney is introduced as part of a storyline involving David Tanaka (Takaya Honda) and Aaron Brennan's (Matt Wilson) niece, Abigail Tanaka (Mary Finn), who she appears "emotionally invested" in. David and Aaron are in belief that Abigail is their daughter Isla, when she is actually Britney's. Cox explained: "Brittany knows the boys have baby Isla. She wants to get close to them so she can see what the situation is and how their baby is." Britney kidnaps Isla when David and Aaron look away for a moment, leaving them to believe their former housemate Nicolette Stone (Charlotte Chimes) has taken her. Cox said her character is not "thinking straight" when she takes the baby, but she feels that it is "her only option." Days after her introduction, it was confirmed that Britney is the baby's biological mother, and that David's brother, Leo Tanaka (Tim Kano), is her father. Following their departure at the end of September, both Britney and Abigail return in December, as part of the show's Christmas episodes. Shortly thereafter, Britney is killed in a storm that falls upon Erinsborough. This comes after she and Leo finally reunite, and her death causes Leo to become a struggling single parent.

Britney walks into Harold's Café and sees David Tanaka, Aaron Brennan and Harlow Robinson (Jemma Donovan) talking together and looking after Isla Tanaka-Brennan. Britney sits down at a nearby table and listens in on their conversation. On Father's Day, Britney continues to stalk David, Aaron and Isla in the Lassiter's complex. After taking a photo, she approaches them and tells them that she could not help but notice how cute their daughter is. Later, Britney visits The Flamingo Bar and asks Roxy Willis (Zima Anderson) if the upcoming Shorts and Briefs Film Festival is family-friendly, to which Roxy says it is. Britney then breaks into 32 Ramsay Street and holds one of Isla's favourite toys. As a series of fireworks go off at the end of the film festival, David and Aaron become distracted and Britney snatches Isla out of their car without them noticing. Constable Levi Canning (Richie Morris) finds Britney and her baby in the Erinsborough Community Centre, where she reveals that the baby is hers.

Nicolette Stone (Charlotte Chimes) returns to Erinsborough with David and Aaron's real baby, Isla Tanaka-Brennan (Axelle Austin; also Finn), and explains everything. Britney fell pregnant with Leo Tanaka's child after they got together in New York City. Britney came to Erinsborough to tell Leo and attended an antenatal class, where she met Nicolette. Nicolette and Britney became good friends and Nicolette found out that Britney's child is Leo Tanaka's, who is the uncle of the baby Nicolette was carrying. Britney went to tell Leo that she is pregnant at his vineyard and saw him kissing Chloe Brennan (April Rose Pengilly), so ran off. Britney left for Canberra with Nicolette and had her baby, but began experiencing post-natal depression. Britney allowed Nicolette to give her baby to Paul Robinson (Stefan Dennis), who thought Britney's baby was Nicolette's.

While cradling her baby in the hospital, Britney is greeted by David and Aaron, who have just discovered the truth, where she explains that her baby is named Abigail. Aaron is reluctant to give Abigail to Britney. Leo walks into the room and meets his daughter, then asks Britney what her plan is, to which she explains that she does not have a plan. Britney says that giving up Abigail was the biggest mistake of her life and that she did not know if Leo wanted to be part of Abigail's life. Terese Willis (Rebekah Elmaloglou) then invites Britney and Abigail into 22 Ramsay Street. Britney and Leo decide to start over as friends for Abigail's sake. However when Leo explains their situation to a nanny, Britney gets mad at him and then accuses him of running away when he says he is going to work. Britney and Leo fail to make amends, causing Terese to convince the two of them to sit down and discuss their issues. Terese offers to babysit Abigail, but while she is, she has to rush to work and lets David and Aaron look after Abigail, who are struggling to bond with their real baby. When Britney returns, she is angry with Terese, David and Aaron and tells David and Aaron to leave. Britney then admits to Leo that she is struggling to bond with Abigail in Erinsborough. Leo informs David that Britney wants to move back to New York. Leo tells Britney that he does not think New York is the right place and suggests moving to New South Wales, where her family are. Britney and Leo take Abigail to say goodbye to David, Aaron, Paul and Harlow, before moving to Wollongong.

Britney and Abigail return to Erinsborough for Christmas, where Britney apologises for her attitude during her last visit. Britney decides to stay for longer and Nicolette suspects it has something to do with Leo. Later, Britney suggests Leo hosts a ladies' lunch at the winery to attain new investors. Afterwards, she admits to Nicolette that she began enjoying her time in Wollongong with Leo a lot. On the day of the lunch, Britney explains she has been promoting the lunch on her socials, but the event does not go as smoothly as she hopes when Vera Punt (Sally-Anne Upton) makes an enemy of everyone. Nicolette later tells Britney that she has her full support if she were to rekindle her relationship with Leo, who continues to bond with Britney over Abigail at the winery and asks her to Roxy and Kyle Canning's (Chris Milligan) wedding. At the wedding, Nicolette inadvertently reveals to Leo how Britney feels, and he kisses her after the ceremony. When a pylon pole falls onto The Flamingo Bar, Britney protects Abigail by taking most of the damage, before she dies from fatal injuries.

Felicity Higgins

Felicity Higgins, played by Isabella Giovinazzo, made her first appearance on 6 October 2021. The character and Giovinazzo's casting details were announced on 8 July 2021. Lisa Wehrstedt of Digital Spy confirmed that Giovinazzo was in the middle of filming her guest stint. Of joining the cast, Giovinazzo stated "I was a little nervous, because this was a different show and the cast might have had a different way of working. But I needn't have worried – they're a great bunch, and everyone was very welcoming and kind." Wehrstedt originally reported that Felicity would bring "some risky and dangerous drama to Ramsay Street." Giovinazzo later said that her character would be a love interest for established regular Levi Canning (Richie Morris), who is in a polyamorous relationship with Amy Greenwood (Jacinta Stapleton), who is concurrently dating Ned Willis (Ben Hall). She and Morris worked with intimacy coach Eve Morey and Giovinazzo said she felt "safe and excited to create something lovely" between their characters. Giovinazzo later said Felicity was "more normal" than previous characters she had played, and described her as being "community minded" and "really nice and straight down the line". The actress also thought Felicity's occupation as a firefighter was "gutsy". Of her romance with Levi, Giovinazzo told Sarah Ellis of Inside Soap that Felicity was hoping to meet someone to create "something lovely with", and she thought Felicity and Levi had similar interests and personalities. When asked about Levi's polyamorous relationship, Giovinazzo explained that her character is "a one girl, one guy kind of person", and she would be hurt and confused if she found out, as she feels that she and Levi have a good connection.

While on her phone, Felicity enters The Waterhole and accidentally bumps into Levi Canning, who spills his drink down his shirt. The two of them joke with each other, before Felicity suggests that they get a drink. As they are talking, Felicity finds out that Levi is a police officer and Levi learns that Felicity is a firefighter, as Ned Willis watches the two of them from afar. Felicity excuses herself from the table and calls someone to let them know that she will have to bail on them because she is having a drink. A week later, Felicity and Levi meet up for another drink. At the end of their date, the two of them walk past Ned and Amy Greenwood. Levi tells Felicity that Amy and Ned are dating, but does not tell her that he is also dating Amy.

Felicity meets Levi for another date, but when Levi is called in to work, Felicity goes to Harold's Café instead. She sees Amy and asks her about Levi's interests, but Amy, believing Felicity was aware of the polyamory, accidentally reveals she is dating Levi too. Felicity then breaks up with Levi. She speaks to Amy at The 82, where Felicity tells Amy that she would not want her boyfriend to have another girlfriend. Ned approaches Felicity at The Flamingo Bar and warns her that Amy is the bar's manager. He then requests that Felicity goes on one more date with Levi, so Levi will break up with Amy. Whilst with Levi, Felicity is approached by Amy, who is attempting to get to know her boyfriend's partner. Levi is proud of Amy, so Felicity and Ned meet to discuss that Ned's plan has not worked. Felicity meets up with Amy and asks her about Levi's preferences in the bedroom. Amy is grossed out and walks off. Ned then books a hotel room for Felicity and Levi, however Amy finds out. Felicity confesses to Levi, who then breaks up with Felicity and says she cannot be trusted. Felicity apologises.

Wendy Rodwell

Wendy Rodwell, played by Candice Leask, made her first appearance on 2 December 2021. Wendy is introduced as the wife of Andrew Rodwell (Lloyd Will) at the Erinsborough Police Ball. Leask continued to make scattered appearances over the next few months and the show's executive producer Jason Herbison later teased, "We also have a new family moving into the street." On screen, Wendy and Andrew buy 26 Ramsay Street and are later added to the opening titles alongside their daughter, Sadie Rodwell (Emerald Chan). Script producer Shane Isheev later revealed that the Rodwells were planned to be the show's "big new family" and the introduction of more Rodwell children would have happened if it were not for the serial's cancellation. Producers introduced Wendy as the new town gossip, with Isheev explaining, "She always puts her foot in her mouth and that came from watching the actress in the police ball – we took what Candice gave us and ran with it." Wendy's final appearance aired on 28 July 2022, as she appeared in the serial's final episode.

Others

References

External links
 Characters and cast at the Official Neighbours website
 Characters and cast at the Internet Movie Database

2021
, Neighbours
2021 in Australian television